Ciprofloxacin/dexamethasone (Ciprodex) is an antibiotic/steroid combination medication. It contains the synthetic broad-spectrum antibacterial agent, ciprofloxacin hydrochloride (0.3%), combined with the anti-inflammatory corticosteroid, dexamethasone (0.1%), in a sterile, preserved suspension for otic use.

Ciprofloxacin, a fluoroquinolone antibiotic, has shown in vitro activity against many Gram-positive and Gram-negative bacteria including Staphylococcus aureus, Streptococcus pneumoniae, Haemophilus influenzae, Moraxella catarrhalis, and Pseudomonas aeruginosa. Dexamethasone acts as an anti-inflammatory corticosteroid.''

Medical uses 
Ciprodex is indicated for use in the treatment of acute otitis media and acute otitis externa (swimmer's ear) in people aged six months and older.

Mechanism of action 
Ciprofloxacin functions as a bactericide by interfering with DNA gyrase, an enzyme with a key role in the synthesis of bacterial DNA. Dexamethasone is used in combination in order to aid in the reducing inflammatory responses that often accompany bacterial infection.

Clinical trials 
In clinical trials, the median time to cessation of ear pain in Ciprodex was five days in a sample population of 909 participants. However, the clinical trial failed to demonstrate any significant benefit of using the combination of active ingredients in Ciprodex over ciprofloxacin alone, in regards to ear pain. Ciprodex was superior to ciprofloxacin in regards to time to cessation of otorrhea.

Phase I 
The most reported adverse effects of phase I studies included headache, rhinitis, pain, dyspepsia, and dysmenorrhea. Investigators did not believe that any of these were directly treatment-related, as many of these events are considered symptoms or manifestations of the underlying illness.

Phase II and III 
Treatment-related adverse effects in AOE studies were determined in phase II and III trials. This includes ear pruritus, ear debris, superimposed ear infection, ear congestion, ear pain, and erythema. Similar effects were demonstrated in AOMT studies. Overall, Ciprodex was determined as a safe and well-tolerated drug for the treatment of AOE and AOMT. The proposed dosage for all patients was also effective and safe. Cure rates for pediatrics were slightly higher than adults in AOE studies.

Drug interactions 
Drug interactions have not been studied with Ciprodex.

Commercialization 
Ciprodex, owned by Alcon Laboratories, Inc., is protected by multiple patents and will be restricted from generic manufacturing until 2025. Ciprodex is the number 1 topical antibiotic ear drop prescribed since 2007 by ENTs and pediatricians. There have been 18 million prescriptions filled for Ciprodex since 2003, making it the world leading marketed ear drops for AOE.

In October 2015, Alcon sued Dr. Reddy's Laboratories (DLR) for allegedly infringing on Ciprodex patents.  A judge in the UK upheld the Alcon patent.

References

External links 
 

Combination drugs
Novartis brands